Capelle is now part of Sprang-Capelle, in North Brabant, Netherlands.

Capelle (from Picard or from occitan capèla, meaning chapel) may also refer to:


Places 
 Capelle, now Kapelle (Schouwen-Duiveland), a drowned village in Zeeland, Netherlands
 Capelle aan den IJssel, town and municipality bordering Rotterdam in South Holland, Netherlands
 Capelle, Nord, in the Nord department, France 
 La Capelle, a commune in the Aisne department, France

Other uses
 VV Capelle, a Dutch football team
 a variant spelling of kapelle, a musical orchestra or choir

People with the surname 
 André Capelle (1891–1972), French cyclist
 Donald Capelle, Marshallese politician
 Eduard von Capelle (1855–1931), German Imperial Navy officer
 Jean Capelle (footballer) (1913–1977), Belgian football player
 Jean Capelle (politician) (1909–1983), French politician

See also
 
 Kapelle (disambiguation)
 Capel (disambiguation)
 Cappel (disambiguation)